The 2016 MTV Africa Music Awards were held on October 22, 2016, at Ticketpro Dome in Johannesburg, South Africa. It recognised and rewarded musicians and achievers who made an impact on African music and youth culture during the eligibility period. The awards ceremony aired live on MTV Base, MTV and BET. It was transmitted worldwide on partner stations and content platforms, including BET International. The show was hosted by Nomzamo Mbatha, Yemi Alade and Bonang Matheba. It featured performances from Future, Yemi Alade, Nasty C, Babes Wodumo, Cassper Nyovest and Patoranking, among others.

The ceremony was sponsored by Joburg Tourism, in partnership and association with Absolut, Google, MTN and DStv. It celebrated African talent across 18 award categories, including Best Male, Best Female, Best Song and Best Collaboration. The contribution of artists from Portuguese and French-speaking countries were also recognised in the Best Lusophone and Best Francophone categories. Additional categories included the Africa Re-Imagined Award and Personality of the Year. The nominees were revealed on 21 September in Johannesburg and on 2 October in Lagos.

Winners and nominees

Artist of the Year
Wizkid
 Black Coffee
 Yemi Alade
 Sauti Sol
 Diamond Platnumz

Song of the Year
Patoranking (featuring Wande Coal) - "My Woman, My Everything"
 Sauti Sol (featuring Ali Kiba) - "Unconditionally Love"
 DJ Maphorisa (featuring Wizkid and DJ Bucks) - "Soweto Baby"
 Babes Wodumo (featuring Mampintsha) - "Wololo"
 Harrysong (featuring Olamide, Kcee, Iyanya and Orezi) - "Raggae Blues"
 Korede Bello - "Godwin"
 Franko - "Coller La Petite"
 Kwesta (featuring Cassper Nyovest) - "Ngud'"
 AKA (featuring Burna Boy, Yanga and Khuli Chana) - "Baddest"

Best Male Act
Wizkid
 Black Coffee
 Patoranking
 AKA
 Diamond Platnumz

Best Female Act
Yemi Alade
 Josey Priscelle
 MzVee
 Tiwa Savage
 Vanessa Mdee

Best Group
Sauti Sol
 Toofan
 R2Bees
 Navy Kenzo
 Mi Casa

Breakthrough Act
Tekno
 Ycee
 Falz
 Nasty C
 Simi
 Franko
 Raymond
 Emtee
 Nathi

Best Collaboration
Wizkid (featuring DJ Maphorisa) and DJ Bucks) - "Soweto Baby"
 Sauti Sol (featuring Ali Kiba) - "Unconditionally Love"
 AKA (featuring Burna Boy, Yanga and Khuli Chana) - "Baddest"
 Patoranking (featuring Sarkodie) - "No Kissing Baby"

Best Live Act
Cassper Nyovest
 Stonebwoy
 Flavour N'abania
 Mafikizolo
 Eddy Kenzo

Video Of The Year
Youssoupha - "Niquer ma vie"
 P.H. Fat (featuring Al Bairre) - "Xavier Dreams"
 Anatii (featuring Nasty C and Cassper Nyovest) - "Jump"
 Sheebah Karungi - "Kisasi Kimu"
 Tiwa Savage (featuring Dr SID) - "If I Start to Talk"

Best Hip-Hop
Emtee
 Riky Rick
 Ycee
 Olamide
 Kiff No Beat

Best Pop & Alternative
Kylie Deutsch
 Shekinah
 Desmond and the Tutus
 Locnville
 TiMO ODV
 Tresor

Best Francophone
Serge Beynaud
 J-Rio
 Toofan 
 Franko
 Magasco

Best Lusophone
C4 Pedro
 Preto Show
 Nga
 Lizha James
 Nelson Freitas

Listener's Choice
Jah Prayzah (Zimbabwe)
 Adiouza (Senegal)
 Burna Boy (Nigeria)
 Bebe Cool (Uganda)
 DenG (Liberia)
 EL (Ghana)
 Jay Rox (Zambia)
 Kansoul (Kenya)
 Kiss Daniel (Nigeria)
 Lij Michael (Ethiopia)
 L.X.G (Sierra Leone)
 Meddy (Rwanda)
 Messias Marioca (Mozambique)
 Prince Kaybee (South Africa)
 Reda Taliani (Algeria)
 Saad Lamjarred (Morocco)
 Sabri Mosbah (Tunisia)
 Sidiki Diabate (Mali)
 Tamer Hosny (Egypt)
 The Dogg (Namibia)
 Yamoto Band (Tanzania)

Personality Of The Year
Caster Semenya
 Linda Ikeji
 Pearl Thusi
 Wizkid
 Pierre-Emerick Aubameyang

Best International Act
Drake
 Rihanna
 Beyonce
 Future
 Adele

Legend Award
Hugh Masekela

References

External links
MTV Africa Music Awards
Website
MAMAs Winners & Photos 2016

MTV Africa Music Awards
MTV Africa Music Awards
MTV Africa Music Awards
MTV Africa Music Awards
MTV Africa Music Awards, 2016
MTV Africa Music Awards